Keith Jessop (10 May 1933 – 22 May 2010) was a British salvage diver and successful marine treasure hunter.

History

Early life
Born in Keighley, West Riding of Yorkshire, as the son of a penniless Yorkshire mill-worker. Jessop learned to deep-dive.

With advances in technology, which allowed longer and deeper dives than ever could be imagined before, his dream of becoming a deep-sea salvager became a reality. Jessop became professionally trained in deep-sea diving and over several decades Jessop had unearthed hundreds of wrecks around the world making several million pounds from his discoveries.

Salvage operations

It was not, however, until 1981 that Jessop was involved in one of the greatest deep-sea salvage operations in history. One day in April 1981 Jessop's survey ship Dammtor began searching for the wreck of the cruiser HMS Edinburgh in the Barents Sea in the Arctic Ocean of the coast of Russia. The ship had been sunk in battle in 1942 during the Second World War while carrying payment for military equipment from Murmansk in Russia to Scotland. His company, called Jessop Marine, won the contract for the salvage rights to the wreck of Edinburgh because his methods, involving complex cutting machinery and divers, were deemed more appropriate for a war grave, compared to the explosives-oriented methods of other companies.

In late April 1981, the survey ship discovered the ship's final resting place at an approximate position of 72.00°N, 35.00°E, at a depth of  within ten days of the start of the operation. Using specialist camera equipment, the Dammtor took detailed film of the wreck, which allowed Jessop and his divers to carefully plan the salvage operation.

Later that year, on 30 August, the dive-support vessel Stephaniturm journeyed to the site, and salvage operations began in earnest. Leading the operation undersea, by mid-September of that year Jessop was able to salvage from the wreck over $100,000,000 in Russian gold bullion—431 bars out of 465—making him the greatest underwater treasurer in history.

His autobiography Goldfinder written in 2001 tells the story of Jessop's life and the salvage of such underwater treasures as HMS Edinburgh.

Jessop's son Graham is also a successful deep-sea salvage diver having opened his own business.

Death
Jessop died in France on 22 May 2010, at the age of 77.

References

External links
 Official site

1933 births
2010 deaths
English underwater divers
English archaeologists
Treasure hunters
Professional divers